The Lough Derg Way is a long-distance trail in Ireland. It is typically completed in three days. It is designated as a National Waymarked Trail by the National Trails Office of the Irish Sports Council and is managed by Shannon Development, Tipperary County Council and Tipperary Integrated Development Company. The trail was reconfigured and relaunched in 2011 with many sections taken off road aided by an investment of €115,000 under the Comhairle na Tuaithe Walks Scheme, which supports landowners to maintain trails that cross their land.

The trail follows the River Shannon and its associated canals from Limerick City to Dromineer on the banks of Lough Derg. Along the way it passes the towns and villages of Clonlara, O'Brien's Bridge, Killaloe, Ballina and Garrykennedy. The trail connects with the East Clare Way at Killaoe.

References

Notes

Bibliography

External links
 Lough Derg Way at IrishTrails.ie
 Lough Derg Way at Shannon Region Trails

Geography of County Limerick
Geography of County Clare
Geography of County Tipperary
Tourist attractions in County Limerick
Tourist attractions in County Clare
Tourist attractions in County Tipperary
Long-distance trails in the Republic of Ireland